Sir Ernest Alfred Thompson Wallis Budge (27 July 185723 November 1934) was an English Egyptologist, Orientalist, and philologist who worked for the British Museum and published numerous works on the ancient Near East. He made numerous trips to Egypt and the Sudan on behalf of the British Museum to buy antiquities, and helped it build its collection of cuneiform tablets, manuscripts, and papyri. He published many books on Egyptology, helping to bring the findings to larger audiences. In 1920, he was knighted for his service to Egyptology and the British Museum.

Personal life
E. A. Wallis Budge was born in 1857 in Bodmin, Cornwall, to Mary Ann Budge, a young woman whose father was a waiter in a Bodmin hotel. Budge's father has never been identified. Budge left Cornwall as a boy, and eventually came to live with his maternal aunt and grandmother in London.

Budge became interested in languages before he was ten years old, but left school at the age of twelve in 1869 to work as a clerk at the retail firm of W.H. Smith, which sold books, stationery and related products. In his spare time, he studied Biblical Hebrew and Syriac with the aid of a volunteer tutor named Charles Seeger. 

Budge became interested in learning the ancient Assyrian language in 1872, when he also began to spend time in the British Museum. Budge's tutor introduced him to the keeper of Oriental Antiquities, the pioneer Egyptologist Samuel Birch, and Birch's assistant, the Assyriologist George Smith. Smith helped Budge occasionally with his Assyrian. Birch allowed the youth to study cuneiform tablets in his office and obtained books for him from the British Library of Middle Eastern travel and adventure, such as Austen Henry Layard's Nineveh and Its Remains.

From 1869 to 1878, Budge spent his free time studying Assyrian, and during these years, often spent his lunch break studying at St. Paul's Cathedral. John Stainer, the organist of St. Paul's, noticed Budge's hard work, and met the youth. He wanted to help the working-class boy realize his dream of becoming a scholar. Stainer contacted W. H. Smith, a Conservative member of Parliament, and the former Liberal Prime Minister William Ewart Gladstone, and asked them to help his young friend. Both Smith and Gladstone agreed to help Stainer to raise money for Budge to attend the University of Cambridge.

Budge studied at Cambridge from 1878 to 1883. His subjects included Semitic languages: Hebrew, Syriac, Ge'ez and Arabic; he continued to study Assyrian independently. Budge worked closely during these years with William Wright, a noted scholar of Semitic languages, among others.

In 1883 he married Dora Helen Emerson, who died in 1926. Budge was knighted in the 1920 New Year Honours for his distinguished contributions to Colonial Egyptology and the British Museum. In the same year, he published his sprawling autobiography, By Nile and Tigris. He retired from the British Museum in 1924, and lived until 1934. He continued to write and published several books; his last work was From Fetish to God in Ancient Egypt (1934).

Career at the British Museum

In 1883, Budge entered the British Museum, working within the recently renamed Department of Egyptian and Assyrian Antiquities. Initially appointed to the Assyrian section, he soon transferred to the Egyptian section. He studied the Egyptian language with Samuel Birch until the latter's death in 1885. Budge continued to study ancient Egyptian with the new keeper, Peter le Page Renouf, until the latter's retirement in 1891.

Between 1886 and 1891, Budge was assigned by the British Museum to investigate why cuneiform tablets from British Museum sites in Iraq, which were to be guarded by local agents of the museum, were showing up in the collections of London antiquities dealers. The British Museum was purchasing these collections of what were their "own" tablets at inflated London market rates. Edward Augustus Bond, the principal librarian of the museum, wanted Budge to find the source of the leaks and to seal it. Bond also wanted Budge to establish ties to Iraqi antiquities dealers in order to buy available materials at the reduced local prices, in comparison to those in London. Budge also travelled to Istanbul during these years to obtain a permit from the Ottoman Empire government to reopen the museum's excavations at these Iraqi sites. The museum archaeologists believed that excavations would reveal more tablets.

During his years in the British Museum, Budge also sought to establish ties with local antiquities dealers in Egypt and Iraq so that the museum could buy antiquities from them, and avoid the uncertainty and cost of excavating. This was a 19th-century approach to building a museum collection, and it was changed markedly by more rigorous archaeological practices, technology and cumulative knowledge about assessing artefacts in place. Budge returned from his many missions to Egypt and Iraq with: large collections of cuneiform tablets; Syriac, Coptic, and Greek manuscripts; and significant collections of hieroglyphic papyri. Perhaps his most famous acquisitions from this time were: the Papyrus of Ani, a Book of the Dead; a copy of Aristotle's lost Constitution of Athens; and the Amarna letters. Budge's prolific and well-planned acquisitions gave the British Museum arguably the best Ancient Near East collections in the world, at a time when European museums were competing to build such collections.

In 1900, the Assyriologist Archibald Sayce said to Budge: 

Budge became assistant keeper in his department after Renouf retired in 1891, and was confirmed as keeper in 1894. He held this position until 1924, specializing in Egyptology. Budge and collectors for other museums of Europe regarded having the best collection of Egyptian and Assyrian antiquities in the world as a matter of national pride, and there was tremendous competition for such antiquities among them. Museum officials and their local agents smuggled antiquities in diplomatic pouches, bribed customs officials, or simply went to friends or countrymen in the Egyptian Service of Antiquities to ask them to pass their cases of antiquities unopened. During his tenure as keeper, Budge was noted for his kindness and patience in teaching young visitors to the British Museum.

Budge's tenure was not without controversy. In 1893, he was sued in the high court by Hormuzd Rassam for both slander and libel. Budge had written that Rassam had used his relatives to smuggle antiquities out of Nineveh and had sent only "rubbish" to the British Museum. The elderly Rassam was upset by these accusations, and when he challenged Budge, he received a partial apology that a later court considered "ungentlemanly". Rassam was supported by the judge but not the jury. After Rassam's death, it was alleged that, while Rassam had made most of the discoveries of antiquities, credit was taken by the staff of the British Museum, notably Austen Henry Layard.

Literary and social career
Budge was also a prolific author, and he is especially remembered today for his works on ancient Egyptian religion and his hieroglyphic primers. Budge argued that the religion of Osiris had emerged from an indigenous African people:

"There is no doubt", he said of Egyptian religions in Osiris and the Egyptian Resurrection (1911), "that the beliefs examined herein are of indigenous origin, Nilotic or Sûdânî in the broadest signification of the word, and I have endeavoured to explain those which cannot be elucidated in any other way, by the evidence which is afforded by the Religions of the modern peoples who live on the great rivers of East, West, and Central Africa ... Now, if we examine the Religions of modern African peoples, we find that the beliefs underlying them are almost identical with those Ancient Egyptian ones described above. As they are not derived from the Egyptians, it follows that they are the natural product of the religious mind of the natives of certain parts of Africa, which is the same in all periods."

Budge's contention that the religion of the Egyptians was derived from similar religions of the people of northeastern and central Africa was regarded as impossible by his colleagues. At the time, all but a few scholars followed Flinders Petrie in his theory that the culture of Ancient Egypt was derived from an invading "Dynastic Race", which had conquered Egypt in late prehistory.

Budge's works were widely read by the educated public and among those seeking comparative ethnological data, including James Frazer. He incorporated some of Budge's ideas on Osiris into his ever-growing work on comparative religion, The Golden Bough.  Though Budge's books remain widely available, since his day both translation and dating accuracy have improved, leading to significant revisions. The common writing style of his era—a lack of clear distinction between opinion and incontrovertible fact—is no longer acceptable in scholarly works. According to Egyptologist James Peter Allen, Budge's books "were not too reliable when they first appeared and are now woefully outdated."

Budge was also interested in the paranormal, and believed in spirits and hauntings. Budge had a number of friends in the Ghost Club (British Library, Manuscript Collections, Ghost Club Archives), a group in London committed to the study of alternative religions and the spirit world. He told his many friends stories of hauntings and other uncanny experiences. Many people in his day who were involved with the occult and spiritualism after losing their faith in Christianity were dedicated to Budge's works, particularly his translation of the Egyptian Book of the Dead. Such writers as the poet William Butler Yeats and James Joyce studied and were influenced by this work of ancient religion. Budge's works on Egyptian religion have remained consistently in print since they entered the public domain.

Budge was a member of the literary and open-minded Savile Club in London, proposed by his friend H. Rider Haggard in 1889, and accepted in 1891. He was a much sought-after dinner guest in London, his humorous stories and anecdotes being famous in his circle.  He enjoyed the company of the well-born, many of whom he met when they brought to the British Museum the scarabs and statuettes they had purchased while on holiday in Egypt. Budge never lacked for an invitation to a country house in the summer or to a fashionable townhouse during the London season.

See also 

 Gebelein predynastic mummies
 Mike the cat, companion of Wallis Budge, who guarded the courtyard of the British Museum for twenty years

Notes and references

Sources

Further reading
 
 British Library, Manuscript Collections, Ghost Club Archives, Add. 52261
 Drower, Margaret. Flinders Petrie: A Life in Archeology (Madison, WI, 1995; 2nd ed.).

External links
 
Texts
 
 
 
 
 Budge, E. A. Wallis (1904). The Gods of the Egyptians. HTML, formatted with images

Others
"E.A. Wallis Budge", British Museum 
Geoffrey Graham, Yale University - list discussion of Egyptian dictionary, How to best use Budge's work and appreciate his ability to synthesize - get some education first, Rostau 
Budge, E. A. Wallis (20 January 1930). "Obituary for Mike The British Museum Cat". Time.
Coptic Martyrdoms etc. In Dialect of Upper Egypt, Volume 1, edited with English translation by E. A. Wallis Budge. London: British Museum, 1914, at Coptic Library website
Coptic Martyrdoms etc. In Dialect of Upper Egypt, Volume 2, edited with English translation by E. A. Wallis Budge. London: British Museum, 1914], at Coptic Library website

1857 births
1934 deaths
19th-century archaeologists
19th-century English writers
20th-century archaeologists
20th-century English writers
Coptologists
Employees of the British Museum
English archaeologists
English Egyptologists
English orientalists
Knights Bachelor
People from Bodmin
Syriacists
Victorian writers